The Rycroft Baronetcy, of Calton in the County of York, is a title in the Baronetage of Great Britain. It was created on 22 January 1784 for Reverend Richard Rycroft. Born Richard Nelson, he was the only surviving son of John Nelson, and had assumed by Royal sign-manual the surname of Rycroft in lieu of his patronymic in 1758. The fifth Baronet was high sheriff of Hampshire in 1899. The sixth Baronet was high sheriff of Hampshire in 1938.

Two other members of the family may also be mentioned. Sir William Henry Rycroft, second son of the fourth Baronet, was a Major-General in the British Army. The second son of the fifth Baronet was the psychoanalyst Charles Rycroft.

Rycroft baronets, of Calton (1784)

Sir Richard Rycroft, 1st Baronet (1736–1786)
Sir Nelson Rycroft, 2nd Baronet (1761–1827)
Sir Richard Henry Charles Rycroft, 3rd Baronet (1793–1864)
Sir Nelson Rycroft, 4th Baronet (1831–1894)
Sir Richard Nelson Rycroft, 5th Baronet (1859–1925) m (1stly) Lady Dorothea Hester Bluett Wallop, 11 Feb 1886 (2ndly), Emily Mary Lowry-Corry, 1 Feb 1911.
Sir Nelson Edward Oliver Rycroft, 6th Baronet (1886–1958)
Sir Richard Newton Rycroft, 7th Baronet (1918–1999)
Sir Richard John Rycroft, 8th Baronet (born 1946)

The heir presumptive to the Baronetcy is Francis Edward Rycroft (born 1950), first cousin of the 8th baronet.

References

Rycroft
1784 establishments in Great Britain